is a prefectural museum in Aizuwakamatsu, Japan, dedicated to the natural history, history, and culture of Fukushima Prefecture. The museum opened in Tsuruga Castle Park in 1986.

Galaxy

See also
 Fukushima Prefectural Museum of Art
 Mutsu Province
 List of Historic Sites of Japan (Fukushima)
Aizuwakamatsu Castle

References

External links
  Fukushima Museum 

Museums in Fukushima Prefecture
Aizuwakamatsu
History museums in Japan
Prefectural museums
Museums established in 1986
1986 establishments in Japan